Wendy Red Star (born 1981) is an Apsáalooke contemporary multimedia artist born in Billings, Montana, in the United States. Her humorous approach and use of Native American images from traditional media draw the viewer into her work, while also confronting romanticized representations. She juxtaposes popular depictions of Native Americans with authentic cultural and gender identities. Her work has been described as "funny, brash, and surreal".

Biography and education 
Red Star was born in 1981 in Billings, Montana. She is of Apsáalooke (Crow) and Irish descent and was raised in Pryor, Montana, on the Crow Reservation, "a rural community that's also a sovereign nation and cultural powerhouse." At age 18, she left the reservation to attend Montana State University - Bozeman. She attended university between 2000-2004, and studied art and Native American Studies. 

Growing up as biracial, Red Star went through identity issues. At elementary school, she was afraid of her classmates knowing that her grandparents were white. When she left the reservation, she had to deal with "otherness": The responses she received to her identity and identity-based artwork often damaged her confidence. She later learned to embrace the identity and was completely comfortable with it at 26 when she had her daughter. She incorporated her cultural identity into her work, reflecting on her childhood and where she grew up.

Her mother was a public health nurse who encouraged Crow cultural pursuits; though Red Star herself did not speak Crow, her adopted Korean sister spoke fluent Crow as a child. Her father ranched and was a licensed pilot who played in the "Maniacs", an Indian rock band. Red Star's uncle Kevin Red Star and grandmother Amy Bright Wings were big influences to her practice.

Red Star's undergraduate and graduate level specialization was in sculpture. Her work also includes photography, fashion design, bead work, fiber art, performance art, and painting. In 2004, Red Star was awarded her Bachelor of Fine Art degree from Montana State University, Bozeman. Red Star furthered her studies at the University of California, Los Angeles where she earned a Master of Fine Art degree in 2006.

In 2012–2013, she was a manager at Chief Plenty Coups State Park, located in Pryor, Montana. In 2014, she moved to Portland, Oregon and worked on Medicine Crow and the 1880 Crow Peace Delegation.  As of 2016, it was reported that Red Star works as a full-time artist in Portland.

She has lectured at Yale University, Dartmouth College, the California Institute of the Arts, and Brown University.

Career

Critical reception 
The Spokesman-Review noted, "Red Star works in a variety of media. Her fiber work blends traditional and contemporary elements, as in her pieces Rez Car Shawl and Basketball Shawl. Her photographs combine stereotypical and authentic images, references to the past and modern day. Many are self-portraits." Red Star's work often includes clichéd representations of Native Americans, colonialism, the environment, and her own family. The Gorman Museum at UC Davis described her work as layering "influences from her tribal background (Crow), daily surroundings, aesthetic experiences, collected ephemera and conjured histories that are both real and imagined." Though she often deals with serious issues of Native American culture, she often employs humor through the inclusion of inflatable animals, fake scenery, and other elements in the work. In her photography, Red Star often depicts herself in traditional elk-tooth dresses that she creates.

Zach Dundas of Portland Monthly noted her "mash-ups of mass-market and Crow culture make perfect sense...Red Star is enjoying a moment in the wider art world. New York's Metropolitan Museum of Art includes her work in a current exhibit of Plains Indian art, and Dartmouth College's Hood Museum is showing her self-portraiture alongside big names like Chuck Close, Cindy Sherman, and Bruce Nauman. Red Star will stage 15 separate exhibitions this year."

According to the description of her APEX exhibit at the Portland Art Museum, her early work "employed gender-focused, political self-imagery...to draw attention to the marginalization of Native Americans." Norman Denizen observed, "Wendy Red Star, Crow Indian cultural activist and performance artist, offers an alternative view, focusing on performances and artworks that contest the images of the vanishing dark-skinned Indian." Her work has been collected at institutions such as the National Museum of the American Indian, the Minneapolis Institute of Arts, and Eiteljorg Museum of American Indians and Western Art.

Advocacy 
Red Star has advocated for improved opportunities for Native women in the art world. In 2014, she curated Wendy Red Star's Wild West & Congress of Rough Riders of the World, "the first-ever all-Native contemporary art exhibition at Bumbershoot", which took place in Seattle during the annual musical concert. There were 10 artists that exhibited, and most of them were Native artists that primarily worked with identity-based artworks. In 2017, Red Star curated an exhibition at the Missoula Art Museum called Our Side, which featured four contemporary Indigenous female artists: Elisa Harkins, Tanya Lukin Linklater, Marianne Nicolson, and Tanis S'eiltin.

Works and publications

Thunder Up Above 

For "Walks in the Dark" of the Thunder Up Above series, she created a costume with European and Victorian motifs in a Native American design, and photoshopped an interplanetary background. Dundas observes, "The sci-fi results evoke the intrigue and suspicion of first contact with an unknown people—or, as she put it in her artist's statement, 'someone you would not want to mess with'."

Four Seasons 
For Red Star's Four Seasons series, the Metropolitan Museum of Art catalog noted, "In this four-part photographic work, Wendy Red Star pokes fun at romantic idealizations of American Indians as 'one with nature.' " Luella Brien of the Native Peoples Magazine wrote the Four Seasons series had an avant-garde quality, with traditional "Native American imagery juxtaposed against authentic imagery". Red Star also uses humor to draw viewers into her work. Blake Gopnik of Artnet News commented, "Posing amid blow-up deer, cut-out coyotes and wallpaper mountains, Red Star uses her series to go after the standard blather about Native American's inevitable 'oneness' with nature." The Saint Louis Art Museum acquired Four Seasons as part of its permanent collection, describing it as among "some of the amazing works of art acquired by the Art Museum in 2014".

White Squaw 
Red Star characterizes her work as research-based, especially as she investigates and explores clichéd Hollywood images like beautiful maidens or western landscapes. While conducting research on the term squaw, she found a reference to White Squaw, a 1950s movie, and later books with pulp-fiction style covers, published as recently as 1997. Red Star took photographic prints of the covers, substituting her own image in a cheap costume for the character "White Squaw", using all the original taglines, with comical satiric effect.

Medicine Crow & The 1880 Crow Peace Delegation 
In 1880, six Crow chiefs traveled to Washington, D.C. to talk with the president because the settlers were about to build a railroad through their hunting territory. She researched Medicine Crow/Peelatchiwaaxpáash (Raven) for her exhibit of the Crow Peace Delegation to Washington in 1880 and discovered the narratives behind elements of the iconic picture. She used a red pen on a print of this famous image to notate his outfit and the symbolism attached to elements such as his ermine shawl, the bows in his hair, and the eagle fan he is holding. Red Star said she wanted to use the details of his clothing, and the ledger drawings he made upon his return to the reservation, to humanize Medicine Crow. What she learns in research emerges in her creative process, which she articulates with visual means.

Circling the Camp 
Red Star took photographs at the Crow Fair - a large annual event in Central Montana that happens every third week of August. In an effort to focus on the culture and history of the Crow nation, she removed the background of the pictures to bring attention to the Indigenous people and objects in the foreground.

Apsáalooke Feminist 
Most photographs of Crow women are colorless, so Wendy Red Star took photographs of herself and her daughter Beatrice with colorful Crow clothes to showcase Crow people's everyday fashion. The patterned background is photoshopped to give the images a visual punch.

My Home is Where My Tipi Sits 
This series of color photographs consists of grids of idiosyncratic, typological elements of life on Crow reservations: government houses, broken down "rez" cars, sweat lodges, signs and churches. The works reference the photographs of German photographers Bernd and Hilla Becher, which inventory industrial buildings and water towers, arranged in grids to create "families of objects."

Let Them Have Their Voice 
This multimedia installation was made in response to the work of Edward S. Curtis in his 1908 multi-volume book The North American Indian. Red Star altered Curtis' portraits and made the Native subjects voids in the frames, reducing them to anonymous silhouettes. The sitters are made present through a sound installation. Wax cylinder recording of Crow singers performing traditional songs which Curtis recorded between 1907-1912. .

Wendy Red Star: A Scratch on the Earth 
This catalogue was published to coincide with the mid-career survey exhibition by the same name. The exhibition was organized by the Newark Museum of Art and shown from February 23-June 16, 2019. This is currently the most comprehensive publication on Red Star and her work.

Collaborations 
In 2013, Red Star began collaborating with her daughter Beatrice Red Star Fletcher, who "figures prominently in her work" and participates as a tour guide for their exhibitions. Their collaborations have been shown at  the Tacoma Art Museum, the Seattle Art Museum, and twice at the Portland Art Museum.

Collections 
Red Star's work is included in: 
 Smithsonian's National Museum of the American Indian
 Metropolitan Museum of Art
 Figge Art Museum 
 George Gustav Heye Center
 Saint Louis Art Museum 
 Hood Museum 
 Crocker Museum of Art 
 Portland Art Museum 
 Nelson-Atkins Museum of Art 
 Nerman Museum of Contemporary Art 
 Minneapolis Institute of the Arts 
 Museum of Contemporary Native Arts 
 C.N. Gorman Museum 
 Art Museum of West Virginia University
 Hallie Ford Museum of Art 
 Triton Museum of Art 
 Autry Museum of the American West 
 Philbrook Museum of Art and 
 Fralin Museum of Art at the University of Virginia.
 Newark Museum of Art
 Herbert F. Johnson Museum of Art

Selected exhibitions 
Red Star has been actively exhibiting her work since 2003. Exhibitions since 2011 include:
 Parading Culture (Tokens, Gold and Glory) Haw Contemporary Fine Art Gallery, Kansas City, Missouri (2016)
 The Plains Indian: Artists of Earth and Sky: Metropolitan Museum of Art (2015)
 Peelatchiwaaxpáash/Medicine Crow (Raven) & the 1880 Crow Peace Delegation: APEX gallery, Portland Art Museum (2015)
 Tableaux Vivant: Nature's Playground. Seattle Art Fair – Volunteer Park. Seattle, Washington (2015)
 Circling the Camp: Wendy Red Star: Indianapolis Museum of Contemporary Art (2014)
 Crow Women's Objects. Saint Louis Art Museum, St. Louis, Missouri. (2014)
 Wendy Red Star: C.N. Gorman Museum (2014)
 I.M.N.D.N. — Native Art for the 21st Century: The Art Gym, Marylhurst University (2014)
 Contemporary American Indian Art: Nerman Museum of Contemporary Art (2014)
 Making Marks: Prints From Crow's Shadow Press: National Museum of the American Indian (2014)
 Cross Currents: Metropolitan State, University of Denver (2013-2014)
 Biennial Contemporary American Indian Arts Series: Native Voices and Identity Narratives: The A.D. Gallery (2013)
 My Home Is Where My Tipi Sits (Crow Country): Missoula Art Museum (2011)
 American Spirit: Bockley Gallery (2011)
Wendy Red Star: A Scratch on the Earth. The Newark Museum of Art (2019)
Indelible Ink: Native Women, Printmaking, Collaboration. University of New Mexico Art Museum. (2020)

Fellowships and grants
 Joan Mitchell Foundation Emerging Artist Fellowship 
 Eiteljorg Contemporary Art Fellowship 
 2017 Louis Comfort Tiffany Foundation

See also 

 Native American women in the arts
 Visual arts by indigenous peoples of the Americas
 Indigenous Futurism

References

External links 
Wendy Red Star official site

Artists from Portland, Oregon
Native American women artists
People from Billings, Montana
1981 births
Living people
21st-century American artists
21st-century American women artists
American multimedia artists
Artists from Montana
People from Big Horn County, Montana
Crow people
American people of Irish descent
Montana State University alumni
University of California, Los Angeles alumni
21st-century Native American women
21st-century Native Americans